Sandra Cecchini was the defending champion but lost in the final 7–5, 6–1 against Isabel Cueto.

Seeds
A champion seed is indicated in bold text while text in italics indicates the round in which that seed was eliminated.

  Sandra Cecchini (final)
  Catarina Lindqvist (second round)
 n/a
  Judith Wiesner (second round)
  Bettina Fulco (second round)
  Isabel Cueto (champion)
  Kathleen Horvath (first round)
  Neige Dias (semifinals)

Draw

External Links
 1988 Volvo Open Draw

Women's Singles
Singles
1988 in Swedish women's sport